ARA Libertad was a battleship that served in the Argentine Navy between 1892 and 1947, and with the Argentine Coast Guard as a pilot station ship from 1947 to 1968. It was the seventh Argentine naval ship with this name.

Design 

Libertad was a battleship designed mainly for coastal and riverine use, being classified by the Argentine Navy as "Riverine Battleship" (Spanish: Acorazado de Río); in the 1902 edition of Jane's Fighting Ships it was listed as "Coast Service Battleship".

It had a steel hull subdivided by transverse and longitudinal bulkheads, with a ram at its bow.

The ship had a single mast and funnel. The mast differed slightly from the one in its sister Independencia.

As designed, its main battery had two 240mm Krupp guns (one at the bow and the other at the stern) on Vavasseur mountings protected with armoured shields, and two quick-firing 120mm Elswick guns on each side. The secondary battery had four 47 mm quick-firing Nordenfelt/Hotchkiss guns, and two 25mm Nordenfelt guns.

History 

In July 1889, the Argentine Naval Commission in London signed a contract with the shipyard Cammell Laird of Birkenhead ordering the construction of "two twin-shaft, ram-equipped battleships for riverine service" (Spanish: dos acorazados de espolón de doble hélice para servicio de ríos) at a unit cost of £ 176.000; this transaction was approved in September of that year by the Ministry.

The first ship, then known as Nueve de Julio and later renamed Libertad when a new cruiser was assigned that name, started construction in 1890 and was launched in 1892; its construction was completed that year. After finalizing trials, in November 1892 the ship was formally accepted by the Argentine Navy, under command of Captain Atilio Barilari. It departed Liverpool on December 20, 1892 and arrived at Buenos Aires on January 25, 1893.

In mid-1894 the ship participated in the naval exercises as part of the 1st Division; later that year it joined its sister ship, Independencia, and the battleship Almirante Brown.

In 1905 it was assigned to the hydrographic survey of the Río de la Plata (English: River Plate); after that it was reassigned to the Training Division. In 1914, Libertad was assigned to train the crews for the new dreadnought battleships being built in the United States (Rivadavia and Moreno). In 1915 the ship was reclassified as a "coast guard ship". In 1918–19 Libertad was maintained in reserve, and by 1922–23 was assigned as training ship. In 1924-25 the ship was again in reserve, being upgraded to use oil fuel rather than coal. In 1927 Libertad was reclassified as a gunboat, and was assigned to the Gunboat Division in 1930.

In December 1946 Libertad was discharged from the Argentine Navy (decree 22.556) and in 1947 transferred to the Coast Guard, to be used as station ship for pilots in the River Plate. In 1968 the ship was discharged from the Argentine Coast Guard.

See also 
 List of ships of the Argentine Navy

References

Notes

Bibliography

Further reading 

 
 .
 
 Burzaco, Ricardo and Patricio Ortíz. Acorazados y Cruceros de la Armada Argentina, 1881–1982. Buenos Aires: Eugenio B. Ediciones, 1997. . . (in Spanish)

External links 
 Battleship "Libertad" - Histarmar website (Historia y Arqueología Marítima - Acorazado de Rio Libertad) (accessed 2015-12-05)

Battleships of the Argentine Navy
1892 ships
Ships built on the River Mersey
Coastal defence ships